The Santana 39 is an American sailboat, that was designed by Gary Mull and W. Shad Turner and first built in 1972.

Production
The boat was built by W. D. Schock Corp in the United States between 1972 and 1979, with 20 examples completed. The design is out of production.

Design
The Santana 39 is a small recreational keelboat, built predominantly of fiberglass. It has a masthead sloop rig, a skeg-mounted rudder and a fixed fin keel. It displaces  and carries  of lead ballast.

See also
List of sailing boat types

Similar sailboats
C&C 39
C&C 40
CS 40
Mirage 39

References

Keelboats
1970s sailboat type designs
Sailing yachts
Sailboat type designs by Gary Mull
Sailboat type designs by W. Shad Turner
Sailboat types built by W. D. Schock Corp